Seth Saita Sakai (May 22, 1932 - May 10, 2007) was an American television and film actor. Sakai's roles included various characters from Hawaii Five-O and Magnum, P.I.. He also featured in the 1991 film, The Perfect Weapon.

Filmography

References

External links

1932 births
2007 deaths
American male film actors
American film actors of Asian descent
American male television actors
American male actors of Japanese descent
20th-century American male actors